Maixent Coly (September 10, 1949 – August 24, 2010) was the Roman Catholic bishop of the Roman Catholic Diocese of Ziguinchor, Senegal.

Born in Affiniam, Coly was ordained to the priesthood on December 30, 1980. He was appointed coadjutor bishop of the Ziguinchor Diocese by Pope John Paul II on April 11, 1993 and was consecrated on December 11, 1993 succeeding on October 23, 1995. Bishop Coly died in office in 2010, aged 60, from undisclosed causes.

References

20th-century Roman Catholic bishops in Senegal
People from Ziguinchor Region
1949 births
2010 deaths
21st-century Roman Catholic bishops in Senegal
Roman Catholic bishops of Ziguinchor